Malpur Arkan is a small village in the Punjab located on the Banga Road, approximately halfway between Nawanshahr and Banga. The village is located in the district of Nawanshahr, Doaba. The village of Malpur Arkan is close to the villages of Mungowal, Khama, Kariha, Bhangalan and Khatkar Kalan.

The village is developing considerably with a newly developed Gurdwara and upgraded local school (10th grade). The main jatt surname of the residents in this village is Ark. There are also other jatt families that carry the surname Kang and Thandi.  Other caste surnames that belong to this village are Chandla and Siniara.

Transportation
Malpur Arkan is well linked by rail with the nearest rail station being Kariha Railway Station (1 km) and by road with Nawanshahr, Banga, Chandigarh and Gurshankar. The nearest local airport is at Chandigargh, and the nearest International airport is Amritsar.

References

External links
Official website

Villages in Shaheed Bhagat Singh Nagar district